The XXXII Golden Grand Prix Ivan Yarygin 2021, also known as Ivan Yarygin (Yariguin) 2021 was a United World Wrestling rankings freestyle wrestling international tournament, which was held in Krasnoyarsk, Russia between 27 and 30 May 2021.

Medal table

Medal overview

Men's freestyle

Women's freestyle

Participating nations
192 competitors from 9  nations participated.

 (2)
 (1)
 (12)
 (1)
 (2)
 (8)
 (164)
 (1)
 (1)

References

External links 
Official website

Golden Grand Prix Ivan Yarygin
Golden Grand Prix Ivan Yarygin
2021 in sport wrestling
May 2021 sports events in Russia